Romantic Getaway is a British comedy television series made for Sky Television and starring Katherine Ryan and Romesh Ranganathan, consisting of six half hour episodes and broadcast from 1 January 2023.

Synopsis
A couple who are struggling to conceive decide to fund more IVF treatment through illegal means. However, things escalate out of their control when they accidentally steal half a million pounds.

Cast
Katherine Ryan as Alison
Romesh Ranganathan as Deacon
Johnny Vegas as Alfie
Harrie Hayes as Esme

Production
The project was co-written and co-produced by Ranganathan through his own production company Ranga Bee. The project was announced in March 2022 with Shaun Wilson directing and Caroline Wallace producing with Jonathan Montague executive producing for Sky Studios. Some filming took place in the summer of 2022 in Jersey, and St Albans.

Broadcast
Romantic Getaway airs in the UK on the Sky Comedy channel and is available on Now on 1 January 2023.

References

External links
 

Television shows filmed in the United Kingdom
2023 British television series debuts
2020s British comedy television series
Jersey in fiction
Sky sitcoms
English-language television shows